Diego López de Vergara y Aguilar (died 1662) was a Roman Catholic prelate who served as Bishop-Elect of Panamá (1662).

Biography
On 8 August 1662, he was appointed during the papacy of Pope Alexander VII as Bishop of Panamá. It is uncertain if he ever took possession of the see; he died in 1662 before he was consecrated.

References

External links and additional sources
 (for Chronology of Bishops) 
 (for Chronology of Bishops) 

Bishops appointed by Pope Alexander VII
1662 deaths
17th-century Roman Catholic bishops in Panama
Roman Catholic bishops of Panamá